Reineri Andreu Ortega (born 1 April 1998) is a Cuban freestyle wrestler. He is a two-time U23 World Champion, two-time Pan American gold medalist and Central American and Caribbean Games gold medalist.

Career 

In 2017, at the Pan American Wrestling Championships held in Lauro de Freitas, Brazil, he won one of the bronze medals in the 57 kg event. At the 2017 World U23 Wrestling Championship held in Bydgoszcz, Poland, he won the gold medal in the 57 kg event.

In 2018, he won the gold medal in the 57 kg event at the Pan American Wrestling Championships held in Lima, Peru. At the 2018 Central American and Caribbean Games held in Barranquilla, Colombia, he won the gold medal in the men's 57 kg event.

In March 2020, he won the gold medal in the 57 kg event at the 2020 Pan American Wrestling Championships held in Ottawa, Canada. He also competed in the 2020 Pan American Wrestling Olympic Qualification Tournament, also held in Ottawa, Canada, without qualifying for the 2020 Summer Olympics in Tokyo, Japan. He lost his first match against Thomas Gilman of the United States which meant that he could no longer become one of the top two wrestlers in his event and qualify for the Olympics.

He lost his bronze medal match in the 57kg event at the 2022 World Wrestling Championships held in Belgrade, Serbia.

Achievements

Freestyle record 

! colspan="7"| International Freestyle & U23 Freestyle Matches
|-
!  Res.
!  Record
!  Opponent
!  Score
!  Date
!  Event
!  Location
|-
! style=background:white colspan=7 | 
|-
|Loss
|57–22
|align=left| Yuki Takahashi
|style="font-size:88%"|0–2
|style="font-size:88%" rowspan=3|May 6–7, 2021
|style="font-size:88%" rowspan=3|2021 World Olympic Qualification Tournament
|style="text-align:left;font-size:88%;" rowspan=3|
 Sofia, Bulgaria
|-
|Win
|57–21
|align=left| Almaz Smanbekov
|style="font-size:88%"|8–5
|-
|Win
|56–21
|align=left| Pedro Mejías
|style="font-size:88%"|5–0
|-
! style=background:white colspan=7 | 
|-
|Win
|55–21
|align=left| Juan Rubelín Ramírez
|style="font-size:88%"|Fall
|style="font-size:88%" rowspan=3|March 15, 2020
|style="font-size:88%" rowspan=3|2020 Pan American Olympic Qualification Tournament
|style="text-align:left;font-size:88%;" rowspan=3|
 Ottawa, Canada
|-
|Win
|54–21
|align=left| Ligrit Sadiku
|style="font-size:88%"|TF 10–0
|-
|Loss
|53–21
|align=left| Thomas Gilman
|style="font-size:88%"|3–4
|-
! style=background:white colspan=7 |
|-
|Win
|53–20
|align=left| Pedro Mejías
|style="font-size:88%"|4–2
|style="font-size:88%" rowspan=3|March 6–9, 2020
|style="font-size:88%" rowspan=3|2020 Pan American Continental Championships
|style="text-align:left;font-size:88%;" rowspan=3|
 Ottawa, Canada
|-
|Win
|52–20
|align=left| Edwin Segura
|style="font-size:88%"|TF 10–0
|-
|Win
|51–20
|align=left| Darian Cruz
|style="font-size:88%"|TF 12–2
|-
! style=background:white colspan=7 |
|-
|Win
|50–20
|align=left| Nathan Tomasello
|style="font-size:88%"|3–1
|style="font-size:88%" rowspan=3|February 9–17, 2020
|style="font-size:88%" rowspan=3|2020 Granma y Cerro Pelado International
|style="text-align:left;font-size:88%;" rowspan=3|
 Havana, Cuba
|-
|Win
|49–20
|align=left| Sean Russell
|style="font-size:88%"|TF 11–0
|-
|Win
|48–20
|align=left| Osmany Diversent
|style="font-size:88%"|TF 10–0
|-
! style=background:white colspan=7 | 
|-
|Win
|47–20
|align=left| Muslim Sadulaev
|style="font-size:88%"|12–10
|style="font-size:88%"|January 25, 2020
|style="font-size:88%" rowspan=5|2019–2020 Deutsche Ringerliga season
|style="text-align:left;font-size:88%;" rowspan=5|
 Germany
|-
|Win
|46–20
|align=left| Muslim Sadulaev
|style="font-size:88%"|
|style="font-size:88%"|January 18, 2020
|-
|Win
|45–20
|align=left| Yowlys Bonne
|style="font-size:88%"|8–4
|style="font-size:88%"|January 11, 2020
|-
|Win
|44–20
|align=left| Dzimchyk Rynchynau
|style="font-size:88%"|TF 16–0
|style="font-size:88%"|December 7, 2019
|-
|Loss
|43–20
|align=left| Georgi Vangelov
|style="font-size:88%"|TF 0–16
|style="font-size:88%"|November 30, 2019
|-
! style=background:white colspan=7 |
|-
|Win
|43–19
|align=left| Adlan Askarov
|style="font-size:88%"|TF 10–0
|style="font-size:88%" rowspan=4|October 28 – November 3, 2019
|style="font-size:88%" rowspan=4|2019 U23 World Championships
|style="text-align:left;font-size:88%;" rowspan=4|
 Budapest, Hungary
|-
|Win
|42–19
|align=left| Ramiz Gamzatov
|style="font-size:88%"|8–2
|-
|Win
|41–19
|align=left| Wanhao Zou
|style="font-size:88%"|5–5
|-
|Win
|40–19
|align=left| Afgan Khashalov
|style="font-size:88%"|7–3
|-
|Loss
|39–19
|align=left| Giorgi Edisherashvili
|style="font-size:88%"|0–6
|style="font-size:88%"|October 19, 2019
|style="font-size:88%" rowspan=2|2019–2020 Deutsche Ringerliga season
|style="text-align:left;font-size:88%;" rowspan=2|
 Germany
|-
|Loss
|39–18
|align=left| Akhmed Idrisov
|style="font-size:88%"|0–7
|style="font-size:88%"|October 12, 2019
|-
! style=background:white colspan=7 |
|-
|Win
|39–17
|align=left| Daniel Nascimento
|style="font-size:88%"|TF 10–0
|style="font-size:88%" rowspan=3|August 9, 2019
|style="font-size:88%" rowspan=3|2019 Pan American Games
|style="text-align:left;font-size:88%;" rowspan=3|
 Lima, Peru
|-
|Loss
|38–17
|align=left| Daton Fix
|style="font-size:88%"|1–4
|-
|Win
|38–16
|align=left| Pedro Mejías
|style="font-size:88%"|4–0
|-
! style=background:white colspan=7 |
|-
|Win
|37–16
|align=left| Giorgi Edisherashvili
|style="font-size:88%"|3–2
|style="font-size:88%" rowspan=5|May 1–3, 2019
|style="font-size:88%" rowspan=5|2019 Ali Aliev International
|style="text-align:left;font-size:88%;" rowspan=5|
 Kaspiysk, Russia
|-
|Loss
|36–16
|align=left| Zaur Uguev
|style="font-size:88%"|0–9
|-
|Win
|36–15
|align=left| Abdullaev Gulomjon
|style="font-size:88%"|3–2
|-
|Win
|35–15
|align=left| Afgan Khashalov
|style="font-size:88%"|5–2
|-
|Win
|34–15
|align=left| Garik Barseghyan
|style="font-size:88%"|3–3
|-
! style=background:white colspan=7 |
|-
|Win
|33–15
|align=left| Darthe Capellan
|style="font-size:88%"|4–0
|style="font-size:88%" rowspan=3|April 18–21, 2019
|style="font-size:88%" rowspan=3|2019 Pan American Continental Championships
|style="text-align:left;font-size:88%;" rowspan=3|
 Buenos Aires, Argentina
|-
|Win
|32–15
|align=left| Lucas Bryan Navarrete Vidal
|style="font-size:88%"|TF 14–3
|-
|Loss
|31–15
|align=left| Josh Rodriguez
|style="font-size:88%"|2–7
|-
! style=background:white colspan=7 |
|-
|Loss
|31–14
|align=left| Tuvshintulga Tumenbileg
|style="font-size:88%"|1–2
|style="font-size:88%" rowspan=4|March 16–17, 2019
|style="font-size:88%" rowspan=4|2019 World Cup
|style="text-align:left;font-size:88%;" rowspan=4|
 Yakutsk, Russia
|-
|Win
|31–13
|align=left| Yuki Takahashi
|style="font-size:88%"|2–2
|-
|Win
|30–13
|align=left| Ali Karaboga
|style="font-size:88%"|5–2
|-
|Loss
|29–13
|align=left| Aryaan Tyutrin
|style="font-size:88%"|3–8
|-
! style=background:white colspan=7 | 
|-
|Loss
|29–12
|align=left| Georgi Vangelov
|style="font-size:88%"|3–3
|style="font-size:88%"|February 2, 2019
|style="font-size:88%" rowspan=2|2018–2019 Deutsche Ringerliga season
|style="text-align:left;font-size:88%;" rowspan=2|
 Germany
|-
|Loss
|29–11
|align=left| Arsen Harutyunyan
|style="font-size:88%"|4–8
|style="font-size:88%"|January 5, 2019
|-
! style=background:white colspan=7 |
|-
|Loss
|29–10
|align=left| Wanhao Zou
|style="font-size:88%"|4–6
|style="font-size:88%" rowspan=3|November 12–18, 2018
|style="font-size:88%" rowspan=3|2018 U23 World Championships
|style="text-align:left;font-size:88%;" rowspan=3|
 Bucharest, Romania
|-
|Win
|29–9
|align=left| Zanabazar Zandanbud
|style="font-size:88%"|5–2
|-
|Win
|28–9
|align=left| Vladimir Egorov
|style="font-size:88%"|7–0
|-
! style=background:white colspan=7 |
|-
|Loss
|27–9
|align=left| Yuki Takahashi
|style="font-size:88%"|4–5
|style="font-size:88%" rowspan=5|October 21–22, 2018
|style="font-size:88%" rowspan=5|2018 World Championships
|style="text-align:left;font-size:88%;" rowspan=5|
 Budapest, Hungary
|-
|Win
|27–8
|align=left| Mihran Jaburyan
|style="font-size:88%"|6–3
|-
|Loss
|26–8
|align=left| Zaur Uguev
|style="font-size:88%"|0–6
|-
|Win
|26–7
|align=left| Kim Sung-gwon
|style="font-size:88%"|4–2
|-
|Win
|25–7
|align=left| Otari Gogava
|style="font-size:88%"|2–1
|-
|Win
|24–7
|align=left| Ghenadie Tulbea
|style="font-size:88%"|12–2
|style="font-size:88%"|October 6, 2018
|style="font-size:88%" rowspan=4|2019–2020 Deutsche Ringerliga season
|style="text-align:left;font-size:88%;" rowspan=4|
 Germany
|-
|Win
|23–7
|align=left| Ibragim Ilyasov
|style="font-size:88%"|2–1
|style="font-size:88%"|September 29, 2018
|-
|Loss
|22–7
|align=left| Georgi Vangelov
|style="font-size:88%"|5–10
|style="font-size:88%"|September 22, 2018
|-
|Win
|22–6
|align=left| Garik Barseghyan
|style="font-size:88%"|8–2
|style="font-size:88%"|September 15, 2018
|-
! style=background:white colspan=7 |
|-
|Win
|21–6
|align=left| Juan Rubelín Ramírez
|style="font-size:88%"|4–1
|style="font-size:88%" rowspan=3|July 29 – August 2, 2018
|style="font-size:88%" rowspan=3|2018 Central American and Caribbean Games
|style="text-align:left;font-size:88%;" rowspan=3|
 Barranquilla, Colombia
|-
|Win
|20–6
|align=left| Pedro Mejías
|style="font-size:88%"|4–1
|-
|Win
|19–6
|align=left| Evin Batista
|style="font-size:88%"|TF 10–0
|-
|Win
|18–6
|align=left| Josh Rodriguez
|style="font-size:88%" |5–2
|style="font-size:88%" |May 17, 2018
|style="font-size:88%" |2018 Beat The Streets: Team USA vs. The World All-Stars
|style="text-align:left;font-size:88%;" |
 New York City, New York
|-
! style=background:white colspan=7 |
|-
|Win
|17–6
|align=left| Óscar Tigreros
|style="font-size:88%"|TF 11–0
|style="font-size:88%" rowspan=4|May 3–6, 2018
|style="font-size:88%" rowspan=4|2018 Pan American Continental Championships
|style="text-align:left;font-size:88%;" rowspan=4|
 Lima, Peru
|-
|Win
|16–6
|align=left| Thomas Gilman
|style="font-size:88%"|7–4
|-
|Win
|15–6
|align=left| Luis Augusto Morales
|style="font-size:88%"|TF 10–0
|-
|Win
|14–6
|align=left| Pedro Mejías
|style="font-size:88%"|6–2
|-
! style=background:white colspan=7 |
|-
|Loss
|13–6
|align=left| Yuki Takahashi
|style="font-size:88%"|4–7
|style="font-size:88%" rowspan=4|April 7–8, 2018
|style="font-size:88%" rowspan=4|2018 World Cup
|style="text-align:left;font-size:88%;" rowspan=4|
 Iowa City, Iowa
|-
|Win
|13–5
|align=left| Mukhambet Kuatbek
|style="font-size:88%"|4–1
|-
|Loss
|12–5
|align=left| Erdenebatyn Bekhbayar
|style="font-size:88%"|0–4
|-
|Loss
|12–4
|align=left| Giorgi Edisherashvili
|style="font-size:88%"|5–7
|-
! style=background:white colspan=7 |
|-
|Win
|12–3
|align=left| Juan Ramirez
|style="font-size:88%"|TF 10–0
|style="font-size:88%" rowspan=3|March 20–25, 2018
|style="font-size:88%" rowspan=3|2018 Central American and Caribbean Championships
|style="text-align:left;font-size:88%;" rowspan=3|
 Havana, Cuba
|-
|Win
|11–3
|align=left| Brandon Escobar
|style="font-size:88%"|TF 10–0
|-
|Win
|10–3
|align=left| Evin Batista
|style="font-size:88%"|TF 10–0
|-
! style=background:white colspan=7 |
|-
|Loss
|9–3
|align=left| Joey Dance
|style="font-size:88%" |Fall
|style="font-size:88%" |February 15–23, 2018
|style="font-size:88%" |2018 Granma y Cerro Pelado Ranking Series
|style="text-align:left;font-size:88%;" |
 Havana, Cuba
|-
! style=background:white colspan=7 |
|-
|Win
|9–2
|align=left| Mikyay Naim
|style="font-size:88%"|6–1
|style="font-size:88%" rowspan=5|November 21–26, 2017
|style="font-size:88%" rowspan=5|2017 U23 World Championships
|style="text-align:left;font-size:88%;" rowspan=5|
 Bydgoszcz, Poland
|-
|Win
|8–2
|align=left| Parviz Ibrahimov
|style="font-size:88%"|5–4
|-
|Win
|7–2
|align=left| Vladimir Egorov
|style="font-size:88%"|3–1
|-
|Win
|6–2
|align=left| Zhandos Ismailov
|style="font-size:88%"|4–0
|-
|Win
|5–2
|align=left| Robert Dobrodziej
|style="font-size:88%"|TF 10–0
|-
! style=background:white colspan=7 |
|-
|Win
|4–2
|align=left| Victor Barron
|style="font-size:88%"|TF 10–0
|style="font-size:88%" rowspan=4|May 5–7, 2017
|style="font-size:88%" rowspan=4|2017 Pan American Continental Championships
|style="text-align:left;font-size:88%;" rowspan=4|
 Lauro de Freitas, Brazil
|-
|Win
|3–2
|align=left| Andre Quispe
|style="font-size:88%"|TF 15–4
|-
|Loss
|2–2
|align=left| Aso Palani
|style="font-size:88%"|12–17
|-
|Win
|2–1
|align=left| Lucas Pavon
|style="font-size:88%"|TF 10–0
|-
! style=background:white colspan=7 |
|-
|Loss
|1–1
|align=left| Sam Hazewinkel
|style="font-size:88%"|4–5
|style="font-size:88%" rowspan=2|February 11–15, 2015
|style="font-size:88%" rowspan=2|2015 Granma y Cerro Pelado International
|style="text-align:left;font-size:88%;" rowspan=2|
 Havana, Cuba
|-
|Win
|1–0
|align=left| Jefferson Mayea
|style="font-size:88%"|TF 10–0
|-

References

External links 
 

Living people
1998 births
People from Sancti Spíritus
Cuban male sport wrestlers
Wrestlers at the 2019 Pan American Games
Medalists at the 2019 Pan American Games
Pan American Games medalists in wrestling
Pan American Games bronze medalists for Cuba
Central American and Caribbean Games gold medalists for Cuba
Competitors at the 2018 Central American and Caribbean Games
Central American and Caribbean Games medalists in wrestling
Pan American Wrestling Championships medalists
21st-century Cuban people